La valse, poème chorégraphique pour orchestre (a choreographic poem for orchestra), is a work written by Maurice Ravel between February 1919 and 1920; it was first performed on 12 December 1920 in Paris. It was conceived as a ballet but is now more often heard as a concert work.

The work has been described as a tribute to the waltz; the composer George Benjamin, in his analysis of La valse, summarized the ethos of the work: "Whether or not it was intended as a metaphor for the predicament of European civilization in the aftermath of the Great War, its one-movement design plots the birth, decay and destruction of a musical genre: the waltz." Ravel himself, however, denied that it is a reflection of post-World War I Europe, saying, "While some discover an attempt at parody, indeed caricature, others categorically see a tragic allusion in it – the end of the Second Empire, the situation in Vienna after the war, etc... This dance may seem tragic, like any other emotion... pushed to the extreme. But one should only see in it what the music expresses: an ascending progression of sonority, to which the stage comes along to add light and movement." He also commented, in 1922, that "It doesn't have anything to do with the present situation in Vienna, and it also doesn't have any symbolic meaning in that regard. In the course of La Valse, I did not envision a dance of death or a struggle between life and death. (The year of the choreographic setting, 1855, repudiates such an assumption.)"

In his tribute to Ravel after the composer's death in 1937, Paul Landormy described the work as "the most unexpected of the compositions of Ravel, revealing to us heretofore unexpected depths of Romanticism, power, vigor, and rapture in this musician whose expression is usually limited to the manifestations of an essentially classical genius."

Creation and meaning 
The idea of La valse began first with the title "Vienne", then Wien (French and German for "Vienna", respectively) as early as 1906, where Ravel intended to orchestrate a piece in tribute to the waltz form and to Johann Strauss II. An earlier influence from another composer was the waltz from Emmanuel Chabrier's opera Le roi malgré lui. In Ravel's own compositional output, a precursor to La valse was his 1911 Valses nobles et sentimentales, which contains a motif that Ravel reused in the later work. After his service in the French Army, Ravel returned to his original idea of the symphonic poem Wien. Ravel described his own attraction to waltz rhythm as follows, to Jean Marnold, while writing La valse:

You know my intense attraction to these wonderful rhythms and that I value the joie de vivre expressed in the dance much more deeply than Franckist puritanism.

Ravel completely reworked his idea of Wien into what became La valse, which was to have been written under commission from Serge Diaghilev as a ballet. However, he never produced the ballet. After hearing a two-piano reduction performed by Ravel and Marcelle Meyer, Diaghilev said it was a "masterpiece" but rejected Ravel's work as "not a ballet. It's a portrait of ballet". Ravel, hurt by the comment, ended the relationship. Subsequently, it became a popular concert work and when the two men met again during 1925, Ravel refused to shake Diaghilev's hand. Diaghilev challenged Ravel to a duel, but friends persuaded Diaghilev to recant. The men never met again. The ballet was premiered in Antwerp in October 1926 by the Royal Flemish Opera Ballet, and there were later productions by the Ballets Ida Rubinstein in 1928 and 1931 with choreography by Bronislava Nijinska. The music was also used for ballets of the same title, one by George Balanchine, who had made dances for Diaghilev, in 1951 and the other by Frederick Ashton in 1958.

Ravel described La valse with the following preface to the score:
Through whirling clouds, waltzing couples may be faintly distinguished. The clouds gradually scatter: one sees at letter A an immense hall peopled with a whirling crowd. The scene is gradually illuminated. The light of the chandeliers bursts forth at the fortissimo letter B. Set in an imperial court, about 1855.

Description

The beginning starts quietly (the mist), with the rumbling of the double basses with the celli and harps subsequently joining. Silently and gradually, instruments play fragmented melodies, gradually building into a subdued tune on bassoons and violas. Eventually, the harps signal the beginning culmination of instruments into the graceful melody. Led by the violins, the orchestra erupts into the work's principal waltz theme.

A series of waltzes follows, each with its own character, alternating loud and soft sequences.
 The variations by oboe, violins and flutes, mild, slightly timid but nevertheless sweet and elegant.
 The eruption of the heavy brass and timpani begins the next ebullient and pompous melody. The tune is sung by the violins as cymbals crash and the brass blare unashamedly.
 Afterwards, the violins lead a tender tune, accompanied by luxuriant humming in the cellos and clarinets. It disappears and once again returns to the sweet variations and extravagant brass.
 Enter a rather restless episode with dramatic violins, accompanied with precocious (yet seemingly wayward) woodwinds. Castanets and pizzicato add to the character of a rather erratic piece. It ends meekly and clumsily in the bassoons.
 The piece relapses into previous melodies, before a poignant and sweet tune begins in the violins. Glissando is a characteristic feature. The gentle violins are accompanied by ornate, chromatic swayings in the cellos and glissando in the harps. The tune is once again repeated by the woodwinds. As it ends, it begins to unleash some kind of climax, when it is suddenly cut off by a sweet flute.
 The flute plays a rather playful, repetitious melody, accompanied by the glockenspiel and triangle. In between, the violins seem to yearn, whilst the harps play and (bizarrely) the horns trill. Once more, as it nears its conclusion, it tries to build up into a climax, but descends once more into the 'mist' of the beginning.

So begins the piece's second half. Every melody from the first section is re-introduced, although differently, in the second section. Ravel has altered each waltz theme piece with unexpected modulations and instrumentation (for example, where flutes would normally play, they are replaced by trumpets). As the Waltz begins to whirl and whirl unstoppably, Ravel intends us to see what is truly happening in this waltz rather symbolically.

Once more, Ravel breaks the momentum. A macabre sequence begins, gradually building into a disconcerting repetition. The orchestra reaches a danse macabre coda, and the work ends with the final measure as the only one in the score not in waltz-time.

The work is scored for 3 flutes (3rd doubling piccolo), 3 oboes (3rd doubling English horn), 2 clarinets in A, bass clarinet in A, 2 bassoons, contrabassoon, 4 horns in F, 3 trumpets in C, 3 trombones, tuba, timpani, bass drum, snare drum, cymbals, triangle, tambourine, tam-tam, crotales, glockenspiel, castanets, 2 harps and strings.

Transcriptions
Apart from the two-piano arrangement, which was first publicly performed by Ravel and Alfredo Casella, Ravel also transcribed this work for one piano. The solo piano transcription is infrequently performed due to its difficulty. Lucien Garban produced a transcription for piano four hands in 1920. He had previously transcribed Ravel's Le tombeau de Couperin in 1919, in a similar fashion. The pianist Glenn Gould, who rarely played Ravel's music, made his own arrangement of it in 1975. In 2008 Andrey Kasparov produced an improved treatment of La valse for piano four hands, with Ravel's original scoring distributed more effectively between the performers. Sean Chen recorded his own arrangement on the Steinway & Sons label in 2014.

In 2005 it was transcribed for Symphonic Wind Ensemble by Don Patterson, for the United States Marine Band, and was recorded on the album Symphonic Dances, conducted by Michael J. Colburn.

Celebrating the 100th birthday of La Valse in 2020 (its première in Paris took place in 1920), Belgian composer Tim Mulleman wrote a transcription for Philippe Graffin and Friends for string nonet (4 vn, 2 va, 2 vc, 1 cb). A filmed performance was made possible by Lars Konings.

Linos Piano Trio included a transcription of the piece for piano trio on their 2021 album Stolen Music.

Ballet 
Ida Rubinstein's company first performed La Valse in 1929, choreographed by Bronislava Nijinska. Much revived, e.g., by New York City Ballet, whose co-founder and founding choreographer George Balanchine made a ballet to La Valse in 1951.

Frederick Ashton also created a La valse ballet in 1958 for The Royal Ballet. At the premiere Francis Poulenc complimented Ashton on what he thought was the first successful interpretation of Ravel's intentions for the music.

References

Bibliography 
Orenstein, Arbie; Ravel: Man and Musician (New York: Columbia University Press, 1968)
Mawer, Deborah: "The Ballets of Maurice Ravel: Creation and Interpretation" (Aldershot: Ashgate, 2006)

External links 

Program notes, Chicago Symphony Orchestra
Recording of La valse in transcription for two pianos by Neal and Nancy O'Doan in MP3 format
Performance of La valse in transcription for solo piano by Jean-Frédéric Neuburger from the Isabella Stewart Gardner Museum in MP3 format
, Leonard Bernstein, Orchestre National de France
, Benjamin Zander, Boston Philharmonic Youth Orchestra
, Yuja Wang, Verbier Festival 2012
, Philippe Graffin & Friends, Traces Festival 2020

Compositions by Maurice Ravel
Ballets by Maurice Ravel
1920 compositions
Waltzes
1926 ballet premieres